NASA Research Park is a research park operated by NASA near San Jose, California, which is developing a shared-use research and development campus in association with government entities, academia, industry and nonprofit organizations. NASA Research Park was approved by NASA in the fall of 2002.

Ames Research Center
Congress established Ames Research Center (Ames) in 1939 as the Ames Aeronautical Laboratory under the National Advisory Committee for Aeronautics (NACA). Ames has grown to occupy approximately 500 acres (2.0 km2) at Moffett Field adjacent to the Naval Air Station Moffett Field in Santa Clara County, California, in the center of the region that would, in the 1990s, become known as Silicon Valley. In 1958, Congress created NASA with the National Aeronautics and Space Act of 1958, 42 U.S.C. § 2451 et seq. At that time, the Ames Aeronautical Laboratory was renamed Ames Research Center and became a NASA field center.

From the 1940s through the 1990s, Ames scientists and engineers conducted flight research in many areas, including variable stability aircraft, guidance and control displays, boundary-layer control, vertical and short takeoff and landing aircraft, and rotorcraft. Ames developed the swept wing design and the conical camber, now considered in the creation of every supersonic airliner.

Ames developed and operated facilities, including flight simulators and wind tunnels, using computers and the arc jets facility to test materials at very high temperatures, critical to high-speed aircraft development and space vehicle re-entry. One of Ames's contribution to the early space program for human missions was solving the problem of getting astronauts safely back to Earth through the development of the blunt body design for re-entry vehicles.

Ames assisted in the development of Apollo, developed and operated the Pioneer Missions (the first spacecraft to travel through the asteroid belts to observe Jupiter and Saturn and Venus), and created the tiltrotor aircraft. The diversity of accomplishments led to the focus in the 1990s on Ames becoming the high-tech center of NASA. In those days, Ames became known as the Center of Excellence for Information Technologies, researching human-centered computing, a significant interdisciplinary effort to develop means of optimizing the performance of mixed human and computer systems. These new technologies were relevant for aeronautics and space operations, with ground-based operators, astronauts (or pilots/controllers in the air traffic management system) and robots functioning collaboratively to maximize mission science return, productivity and safety. This human-centered computing focus developed the expertise for Ames to become the lead for all supercomputing in NASA, and in 2005 Ames operated the world's second fastest supercomputer, partnered with S.G.I. and Intel.

In the 1990s, following its historical experience in life and space sciences, Ames developed a focused new program called Astrobiology to search for the origins of life in the universe. Ames led NASA's Kepler Mission, a spacecraft designed to find Earth-sized planets in other galaxies that may be in or near habitable zones. Ames developed SOFIA, the new Stratospheric Observatory for Infrared Astronomy, using a Boeing 747 aircraft that studied the universe from 2010 to 2022 in the infrared spectrum.

Concurrent with innovations in science and technology, Ames has created partnerships with universities and industry, both onsite and in distance collaborations. The opportunity for this new partnering became available in the early 1990s, with the potential for R&D partners to move into the property obtained from the transfer of Navy Moffett Field land to NASA.

From its establishment in 1939, Ames shared the land, generally known as Moffett Field, with the United States Navy, jointly using the major airfield on the property. In the 1930s, the Navy developed Moffett Field originally for the home of the famous "Lighter than Air Era of American Military History," housing and operating large-scale airships. Through the years, several military organizations, including the United States Air Force, used the Moffett Field facilities, and in the late 1980s, the Navy operated the base.

With the enactment of the Base Realignment and Closure Act in 1991, Congress directed the Navy to close and vacate the Naval Air Station at Moffett Field. Under the Federal Property Administrative Services Act of 1949, 40 U.S.C. §471, NASA successfully negotiated custody of most of the Navy property, with the strong support of the local governments surrounding Moffett Field and the U.S. Congressmen from the area, especially Rep. Norman Mineta. The decision was approved adequately through the federal government process to transfer the property to NASA and disestablish the Naval Air Station Moffett Field. The United States Department of Defense decided to retain control of 57 hectares (140 acres) of military housing at Moffett Field. In 1994, the Department of the Navy transferred approximately 600 hectares (1,500 acres) to NASA. This transfer created a unique opportunity for NASA to provide stewardship for the entire 800-hectare (2,000-acre) site, except the military housing.

Before obtaining control of Moffett Field, NASA prepared the Moffett Field Comprehensive Use Plan (C.U.P.) to implement its management program for the newly expanded Ames. An Environmental Assessment (E.A.) and Finding of No Significant Impact accompanied the plan. The E.A. established under the C.U.P. allows for the development of up to approximately 102,000 square meters (1.1 million square feet) of new construction.

NASA Research Park
In November 1996, the neighboring cities of Mountain View and Sunnyvale formed the Community Advisory Committee to study and provide input to Ames about the best reuses of Moffett Field. Ames developed a six-point initiative, which outlined program goals and reuse concepts for the development of the former Navy base that basically focused on university and industry building on NASA property as R&D collaborative partners. In 1997, after extensive public outreach and public meetings, the final report advisory committee endorsed NASA's six-point initiative, which established the plans to develop what became the NASA Research Park.

Ames leaders reviewed studies of research parks worldwide and continued to work with the neighboring communities in preparing its preferred development plan. In 1998, Ames and the cities of Sunnyvale and Mountain View signed a memorandum of understanding to work jointly on development. Also, a number of major universities were involved in planning their potential roles in development. In mid-1998, Ames leaders presented their plan to NASA HQ and secured approval to proceed.

On December 8, 1998, NASA unveiled its visionary concept for a shared-use R&D and education campus for collaborations among government, industry, academia and non-profit organizations at a national press conference with NASA Administrator Dan Goldin. Over the next year, MOUs for planning development were signed with the University of California, Carnegie Mellon University, San Jose State University and Foothill-DeAnza Community College.

In addition to federal, state and community leaders' inputs, Ames worked closely with a number of economic development and industry organizations in focused groups by industry: information technology, bio-technology and others to understand the needs of Silicon Valley high-tech industry. In 1999, this vision was outlined in an Economic Development Concept Workbook, which won the 2000 American Planning Association Award.

Development
NASA's goal is to develop a world-class, shared-use research and development campus in association with government entities, academia, industry and nonprofits. The NADP/EIS provides a framework to guide the use, renovation, management and development of facilities at Ames over the next 20 years to achieve that goal. The NRP supports NASA's overall mission in three areas: advancing NASA's research leadership; facilitating science and technology education; and creating a unique community of researchers, students and educators.

NASA's recent vision and mission statements recognize that not from NASA alone, not from industry alone and not from universities alone will tomorrow's innovations emerge. They will come from the integration of these different segments, each making the most of their unique attributes—NASA's focus on high-risk, long-term research; industry's ability to react quickly with applied technologies; and the universities' expertise in educating and providing a vibrant workforce for the future.

The Vision for Space Exploration (VSE) announced in 2004 requires NASA to reach out and partner with all kinds of relevant organizations to sustain the long-term vision. The NRP has and is continuing to bring together outstanding diverse partners, assisting the pursuit of the VSE and other NASA programs. Through the interaction of academia, industry and nonprofit organizations at a robust federal laboratory, a unique community of researchers, students and educators with a shared mission to advance human knowledge will be created. This is the goal of the NRP.

In October 2011, the President issued a Presidential Memorandum "Accelerating Technology Transfer and Commercialization of Federal Research in Support of High-Growth Businesses" that directs federal agencies to "Facilitate Commercialization through Local and Regional Partnerships.  Agencies must take steps to enhance successful technology innovation networks by fostering increased Federal laboratory engagement with external partners, including universities, industry consortia, economic development entities, and State and local governments." and "to use existing authorities, such as Enhanced Use Leasing or Facility Use Agreements, to locate applied research and business support programs, such as incubators and research parks, on or near Federal laboratories and other research facilities to further technology transfer and commercialization. I encourage agencies with Federal laboratories and other research facilities to engage in public-private partnerships in those technical areas of importance to the agency's mission with external partners to strengthen the commercialization activities in their local region."  NRP has implemented this directive through its program of onsite and offsite industry and academic partnerships.

Awards 
2003: General Services Administration Award. The General Services Administration (GSA) awarded its Seventh Annual GSA Achievement Award for Real Property Innovation to NASA for its NASA Ames Development Plan that established NRP. In making the agency's award, GSA Administrator Stephan A. Perry stated that "as our country changes, our mandate for excellence is creating an every more responsive government to serve our citizens better...(the) NASA Ames Development Plan will provide an integrated, dynamic research and development community."

2015: Best Civic Project. The San Jose/Silicon Valley Business Journal gave its top "Best Civic Project of the Year" award to NASA and Google for their landmark ground lease of the 1,000 acre Moffett Federal Airfield.

Key partners

Google
On September 30, 2005, NASA and Google announced a Memorandum of Understanding (MOU) at a national press conference to pursue R&D collaborations with Ames in the areas of: large-scale data management; massively distributed computing; Bio-Info-Nano Convergence; and R&D activities to encourage the entrepreneurial space industry and plan to build  of new facilities. In 2006, NASA and Google signed a major Space Act Agreement for Research and Development Collaboration with planned continuing new R&D annexes being added. In 2007, Google announced their Lunar X PRIZE, a $30 million international competition to safely land a robot on the surface of the Moon, travel 500 meters over the lunar surface, and send images and data back to the Earth.  In 2008, Google Inc. and NASA signed a long-term ground lease for 42 acres in NRP.  The San Jose Business Journal awarded the NASA/Google ground lease its "Deal of the Year" award in 2008. In late 2012 Google broke ground to construct up to 1.2 million in new office/R&D facilities near its Googleplex in Mountain View, CA.  Google released details of its planned construction of its new campus to  Vanity Fair in February 2013 and simultaneously issued a press statement confirming construction plans to the media.  The announcement has been reported internationally, including the  Wall Street Journal in the United States.

Carnegie Mellon University - Silicon Valley Campus
In 2002, Carnegie Mellon University established a branch campus in Silicon Valley to connect its many distinctive technology education programs to the innovative business community at the epicenter of the 21st century technology revolution. The university's Silicon Valley Campus offers master's programs in Software Engineering, Software Management, Engineering & Technology Innovation Management, and Information Technology, as well as a bicoastal Ph.D. program in Electrical and Computer Engineering with a focus in Mobility offered in conjunction with the new CyLab Mobility Research Center. Over 600 graduate-level students have received degrees at the Silicon Valley campus located in two historic buildings at NRP.

Environmental issues
The Navy has the responsibility to remediate the PCB hazard in the metal outer structure of the Hangar One building. The exterior skin is in the process of being removed, and the course of action for the remaining structural skeleton has yet to be publicly announced. The long and public process of developing and analyzing courses of action is ongoing. Many have expressed hope that this dynamic  historic icon of the South Bay Area can be saved and utilized for a public purpose.

Parts of the research park lands are on a superfund site. However, NASA studies have shown that the lands are still usable and only require a particular type of construction.

External links
NASA Research Park 
NASA Ames Research Center

References

National Aeronautics and Space Act of 1958, 42 U.S.C. § 2451 et seq.
"Seven Decades of Innovation" Ames Research Center, by NASA Ames historian Jack Boyd
NASA Ames Research Center. NASA Ames Research Center Economic Development Concept Workbook, June 1999
National Academies Press (2001)
"A Review of the New Initiatives at the NASA Ames Research Center: A Summary of a Workshop" 
Authors: Charles W. Wessner, Editor, Steering Committee for Government-Industry Partnership for the Development of New Technologies, Board on Science, Technology, and Economic Policy, National Research Council
NASA Ames Development Plan 2002, NASA Ames Research Center
DCE, 2002. NASA Ames Development Plan, Final Programmatic Environmental Impact Statement, NASA Ames Research Center, Design, Community, and Environment, July 2002.
Real Property Policysite, Best Practices Special Edition Fall 2003, General Services Administration Office of Governmentwide Policy
Enhanced Use Leasing statute, H.J.RES.2
Consolidated Appropriations Resolution, 2003 
(Enrolled as Agreed to or Passed by Both House and Senate) 
ENHANCED-USE LEASE OF REAL PROPERTY DEMONSTRATION 
NASA Strategic Plan 2007
Vision for Space Exploration, announced by President Bush, press release Office of the Press Secretary, "President Bush Announces New Vision for Space Exploration," January 14, 2004.
Explore Space, NASA Research Park Business Plan 2007

Science parks in the United States
Mountain View, California
Ames Research Center
Apollo program
Pioneer program
Buildings and structures in Santa Clara County, California